Norman Fox may refer to:

 Norman Fox (cricketer), Australian cricketer
 Norman A. Fox, American writer of westerns
 Norman Fox & The Rob-Roys, American 1950s doo-wop group from New York